= Area 17 =

Area 17 can refer to:

- Area 17 (Nevada Test Site)
- Visual cortex, Brodmann area 17
